The 2003 K League was the 21st season of the K League. It kicked off on March 23, and was finished on 16 November.

League table

Top scorers

Awards

Main awards

Best XI

Source:

See also
 2003 Korean FA Cup

References

External links
 RSSSF

K League seasons
1
South Korea
South Korea